Endamoeba is a genus of amoeboids in Amoebozoa. It includes the species Endamoeba blattae (type species), Endamoeba lutea, and Endamoeba similans.

References

Amoebozoa genera